Andrena lauracea is a rare bee species from the United States. It has been collected twice in Carlinville, Illinois, once around 1897 and once in 1970–1972. There are also two putative specimens from Texas.

The Carlinville specimens were collected on Sassafras variifolium (1897) and Prunus serotina (1970).

References 

Insects of the United States
lauracea
Macoupin County, Illinois
Insects described in 1879